Arya Tea Estate is a tea garden in the Darjeeling Pulbazar CD block in the Darjeeling Sadar subdivision of the Darjeeling district in West Bengal, India

History

The Arya Tea Estate was established in 1885 and was originally known as ‘Sidrabong’. Legend tells that the garden was founded by Buddhist monks who developed and cultivated different varieties of Chinese seed. The house inhabited by the monks in the 19th century can still be found on the estate.

The original factory was destroyed by a fire in May 1999, leading to the construction of a new factory costing USD 350,000.

Geography
The plantation starts at an altitude of 1820 meters and spreads down to 900 meters, with an average elevation of about 1500 metres.  It produces around 70 tons of tea annually, 30 tons less than before the estate became organic.  Some of its most famous teas are its ‘Jewel’ range, including Ruby (Black Tea), Emerald (Green Tea), Pearl (White Tea), Diamond (Chunky Tips) and Topaz (Oolong). All of their Jewel range teas are produced from special clonal tea bushes mainly from AV2 varietal planted on the highest point of the tea garden area. These teas are often produced in very limited quantities and only a few re-sellers get their hands on it. They also produce classic varieties of chinary teas labelled as  "FTGFOP1" and some special ones with musky flavors as "muscatel". Some new teas such as "Moonbeam" is also of excellent quality produced from AV2 leaves which is more between their Diamond and Ruby teas.

The roads leading to the estate are extremely cumbersome, often with a gradient of up to 45 degrees, making it extremely difficult to drive vehicles there. Only the tea garden drivers are experienced enough to drive the Arya terrain. The monsoon season proves dangerous for inexperienced drivers due to extremely slippery road conditions. During the winter months all estates in Darjeeling go under dormant conditions due to extreme cold temperatures, until the harvests begin again in February.

Economy
Arya Tea Estate is a manufacturer of specialty teas for international sale, as part of the Indian holding company Eurasia Group. The estate sits at an average altitude of 1500 metres and covers 125 hectares, with just over  under tea plantation.

Arya Tea Estate does business as Arya Tea Co. Ltd., Kolkata and its operations are certified USDA Organic by IMO Control. The other Organic certifications are by IMO and JAS. Additionally, Arya is a certified member of the Darjeeling Tea Association.

References

Tea estates in Darjeeling district